Zhadnost: The People's Party is a video game developed and published by British company Studio 3DO for the 3DO.

Gameplay
Zhadnost: The People's Party is a game show consisting of a series of simple contests, using full motion video contestants and cutscenes.

Development and release 
The Zhadnost is a video game developed and published by British company Studio 3DO in 1995.

Reception 

Next Generation reviewed the 3DO version of the game, rating it three stars out of five, and stated that "It makes a great party game, but wears thin too quickly."

References 

1995 video games
3DO Interactive Multiplayer games
3DO Interactive Multiplayer-only games
Communism in fiction
Multiplayer video games
North America-exclusive video games
Party video games
Quiz video games
Video games developed in the United Kingdom